Alice de la Roche, Lady of Beirut, Regent of Beirut (died 1282) was the wife of John II, Lord of Beirut in the Kingdom of Jerusalem. She was a daughter of Guy I, Lord of Athens. Alice is sometimes referred to as Alice of Athens. Alice was regent of Beirut for her daughter, Lady Isabella, while Isabella was the queen consort of Cyprus.

Family 
Alice was born on an unknown date. She was one of six children of Guy I de la Roche, Lord of Athens (1205–1263), and his wife, an unnamed woman of the noble House of Villehardouin.  Her paternal grandfather was Otho I de la Roche, Lord of Athens. According to a partially fictional tradition, her father Guy was created Duke of Athens in 1260 by King Louis IX of France.

Alice had two brothers and three younger sisters:
John I de la Roche, Duke of Athens (died 1280), succeeded his father as Duke in 1263. He died unmarried and childless.
William de la Roche (died 1287), Duke of Athens, married Helena Angelina Komnene, by whom he had one son, Guy II, Duke of Athens.
Marguerite de la Roche (died after 1293), married Henry I, Count of Vaudémont.
 Isabella de la Roche, married firstly, Geoffrey of Briel, Lord of Karytaina. She married secondly, Hugh of Brienne, Count of Brienne and Lecce, by whom she had a son, Walter of Brienne, who in turn married Jeanne de Châtillon and had issue, and a daughter, Agnes of Brienne, wife of John, Count of Joigny. Mary, Queen of Scots, and Queen consort Elizabeth Woodville and her siblings were among Isabella's many descendants.
 Catherine de la Roche, married Carlo di Lagonessa, Seneschal of Sicily.

Marriage and issue 
In 1249/1250, Alice married John II of Ibelin, Lord of Beirut, the son of Balian of Ibelin, Lord of Beirut and Eschiva de Montfaucon de Montbéliard. He was the grandson of John of Ibelin, the Old Lord of Beirut and Melisende of Arsuf. In 1260, he led a massive raid alongside the Knights Templars into Galilee. John and the Templars were defeated  near Tiberias by the Turcomen. John was taken prisoner and later ransomed.

John and Alice had two daughters:
 Isabella of Ibelin, Lady of Beirut, Queen of Cyprus (1252- 1282/November 1283), married firstly King Hugh II of Cyprus, secondly Hamo le Strange, and thirdly, William Barlais. All three marriages were childless.
 Eschive of Ibelin, Lady of Beirut (1253–1312), married firstly, in 1274, Humphrey de Montfort, Lord of Tyre, by whom she had four children, including Rupen de Montfort; she married secondly in 1291, Guy of Lusignan, Constable of Cyprus, by whom she had two children, King Hugh IV of Cyprus, and Isabelle de Lusignan. Upon the death of her sister Isabella, who died without issue, Eschive inherited the lordship of Beirut. She unsuccessfully claimed the dukedom of Athens by right of her mother.
During her daughter Isabella's absence in Cyprus, from 1274–1277, Alice was Regent of Beirut.

Legacy 
Alice of Athens, Lady of Beirut, Regent of Beirut died in 1282. Her husband John had died in 1264.
Their numerous descendants included Anne de Lusignan, King Charles VIII of France, Anne of France and Mary, Queen of Scots.

In 1308, her nephew Guy II, Duke of Athens died without heirs. Alice's daughter Eschive claimed the dukedom, but lost to Walter V of Brienne, the son of Alice's sister Isabella.

References

13th-century births
1282 deaths
Year of birth unknown
Women of the Crusader states
13th-century women rulers
13th-century Greek women
13th-century Greek people
Alice